The 1924 Bavarian state election was held on 6 April and 4 May 1924 to elect the 129 members of the Landtag of Bavaria.

Results

References 

1924 elections in Germany
1924